Pierre Bilal Koko'o Lotti Abalintsina (born January 18, 1986 in Ebolowa), known as Koko'o, is a Cameroonian football player last played for Finnish side JIPPO.

Career 
Koko'o always had a reputation for scoring goals, and this earned him several moves throughout his career. Prior to his move to Al Ahly Tripoli, the Cameroonian topped the Botola scoring charts with 17 goals in 21 games for Moghreb Tétouan. He signed a five-year deal with Al Ahly Tripoli, the first year being a loan, believed to be worth $800,000, 40 times the $20,000 Moghreb Tétouan paid for him a year earlier to sign him from ASEC Mimosas.

Honours
 Côte d'Ivoire Cup 2007 – Winner
 Côte d'Ivoire Premier Division 2007 – Runner-up

References

1986 births
Living people
People from Ebolowa
Cameroonian footballers
Association football forwards
Mamelodi Sundowns F.C. players
Al-Ittihad Aleppo players
ASEC Mimosas players
Moghreb Tétouan players
JIPPO players
Cameroonian expatriate footballers
Expatriate soccer players in South Africa
Expatriate footballers in Libya
Expatriate footballers in Morocco
Expatriate footballers in Syria
Expatriate footballers in Ivory Coast
Expatriate footballers in Finland
Cameroonian expatriate sportspeople in South Africa
Cameroonian expatriate sportspeople in Morocco
Cameroonian expatriate sportspeople in Syria
Cameroonian expatriate sportspeople in Libya
Cameroonian expatriate sportspeople in Ivory Coast
Cameroonian expatriate sportspeople in Finland
Syrian Premier League players